Senta Verhoeven (née Berger; Austrian German: , ; born 13 May 1941) is an Austrian-German actress. She received many award nominations for her acting in theatre, film and television; her awards include three Bambi Awards, two Romys, an Adolf Grimme Award, both a Deutscher and a Bayerischer Fernsehpreis, and a Goldene Kamera.

Early life 
Berger was born in Vienna to musician Josef Berger and teacher Therese Jany. She first appeared on stage at the age of four, when her father accompanied her singing on the piano. At the age of five she started ballet lessons.

Berger also took private acting lessons. In 1957, she won her first small role in The Unexcused Hour, one of the final films directed by Austrian auteur Willi Forst. She applied for the Max Reinhardt Seminar, a famous acting school in Vienna, and was accepted, but she left shortly afterwards after accepting a film role without permission. In 1958, she became the youngest member of the Josefstadt Theatre in Vienna and appeared in productions of L'Œuf, Charley's Aunt, Much Ado About Nothing and Cat on a Hot Tin Roof.

Career 

In 1960, Bernhard Wicki and Artur Brauner produced the comedy film The Good Soldier Schweik with Berger and the German actor Heinz Rühmann. Brauner used Berger in several films, but she soon tired of musicals. In 1962, she went to Hollywood and worked with stars such as Charlton Heston, Dean Martin, Frank Sinatra, Richard Widmark, John Wayne, Kirk Douglas, and Yul Brynner. She returned to Germany to accept an offer for a role in a series, which would have included an obligation of several years. Early publicity material compared her to Brigitte Bardot and Sophia Loren.

In 1963, Berger met Michael Verhoeven, son of the German film director Paul Verhoeven (not to be confused with the Netherlands Paul Verhoeven). In November 1964, she guest starred in an episode of the U.S. television show The Man from U.N.C.L.E, entitled "The Double Affair". It was later expanded and released in cinemas as the feature film The Spy with My Face (1965). Also in 1965, she starred in The Glory Guys, a dramatic representation of Custer's Little Big horn disaster, based on the novel The Dice of God by Hoffman Birney. Filmed by Levy-Gardner-Laven and released by United Artists, it stars Tom Tryon, Harve Presnell, Senta Berger, James Caan, and Michael Anderson Jr. Berger and Verhoeven started their own film production company in 1965, and married in 1966. Berger continued to develop her European career in France and Italy.

In 1966, Berger co-starred with Kirk Douglas in the film Cast a Giant Shadow. Berger played the role of Magda, a soldier in the Israeli army during the 1948–1949 Palestine war. Also in 1966, the British film Our Man in Marrakesh, called Bang, Bang, You're Dead in the U.S., was released, starring Senta Berger opposite Tony Randall. In The Quiller Memorandum, a third film of hers released in 1966, she played opposite Max von Sydow and George Segal in the role of a German schoolteacher involved in neo-Nazi activity. In 1967, Berger acted in the pilot film for the Robert Wagner television series It Takes a Thief, which aired on the U.S. television network ABC on 9 January 1968. She reprised her role in the series in October 1969, in an episode in which her character was killed.

In 1970, Berger starred for the first time in a film produced by her own company and directed by her husband. In 1971, Berger participated in the media campaign "We've had abortions!" launched by German feminist Alice Schwarzer with a cover story in the Stern political magazine. In 1972, she also campaigned for Willy Brandt's Social Democratic Party. 

Following the birth of her first son, Berger soon returned to theatre work. She played at the Burgtheater in Vienna, at the Thalia Theater in Hamburg and at the Schiller Theater in Berlin. Between 1974 and 1982, she played the "Buhlschaft" in the play Jedermann at the Salzburg Festival with Curd Jürgens and Maximilian Schell. She also acted alongside Schell and James Coburn in a supporting role in the acclaimed war film Cross of Iron (1977). In 1977, she was head of the jury at the 27th Berlin International Film Festival. Twenty-one years later, she was part of the jury at the 48th Berlin International Film Festival.

In 1985–86, Berger started a comeback in front of German-speaking audiences in the TV serial Kir Royal. (In the 1980s, Berger discovered she was admired by Scottish drifter Arthur Richard Jackson who had attempted to murder American actress Theresa Saldana in 1982.) Further serial hits followed, like Die schnelle Gerdi ("The fast Gerdi", 1989–2002), where she played a taxi driver. In the same year, she also started a career as a singer of chansons. From 2003 to 2010, Berger was president of the German Film Academy, which seeks to advance the new generation of actors and actresses in Germany and Europe. Since 2005, the Academy assigns the annual German Film Awards or Lola Awards.

2005 saw her in the film, Einmal so wie ich will ("Once according to my will"), as a woman trapped in an unhappy marriage who finds love on holiday, but turns her back on the relationship. In 2016, she played one of the leading roles in the film Welcome to Germany, directed by her son Simon. The film grossed more than US$20 million, making it the most successful German picture of the year.

She played the role of doctor Eva Maria Prohacek in the popular German crime television series Unter Verdacht ("Under Suspicion") from 2002 till March 2020, when she retired from the role.

Memoirs 
In the spring of 2006, Berger's autobiography was published in Germany: Ich habe ja gewußt, daß ich fliegen kann ("I Knew That I Could Fly"). Among her memories of Hollywood are a less-than-subtle attempt by Darryl Zanuck to get her on his casting couch, and of all the shallow people she met in Hollywood.

Personal life 

Berger married German film director Michael Verhoeven in 1966; their sons are actor-director Simon Verhoeven (born 1972) and actor Luca Verhoeven (born 1979). She lives in Germany.

Selected filmography

Film

Television

Honors and awards 

 Bambi Prize (1968)
 Bravo Otto in Bronze (1969)
 Film Award in Silver (production) for Die Weiße Rose on behalf of the film company Sentana (1983)
 German Actor Award (Chaplin-shoe) for her role in Kir Royal (1987)
 Bambi Prize, Special Bambi "Unknockable Stars" (1990)
 Golden Gong (1996)
 Austrian Cross of Honour for Science and Art, 1st class (1999)
 Karl Valentin Order (1998)
 Golden Romy as the most popular actress (1998)
 Bambi Prize in the category for the ARD miniseries Love and Other Catastrophes (1999)
 Federal Cross of Merit (1999)
 Bavarian Order of Merit (2002)
 German Hörbuchpreis (2003)
 Medal Munich shines (for outstanding service to Munich) (2003)
 Hessian TV award as an ensemble member of the film The Conference (2005)
 Golden Ox – Honorary Award of the Film Arts Festival Mecklenburg-Vorpommern to the Sentana Film Production Senta Berger and Michael Verhoeven (2005)
 Billy Wilder Award (2006)
 Platinum Romy for lifetime achievement (2007)
 Special Prize of the German TV crime Award for her starring role in the WDR production Schlaflos ("Sleepless") (2009)
 Herbert-Strate Prize of the NRW Film Foundation and the Association HDF Kino Cinema (2009)
 German Television Award for Best Actress for her leading role in Schlaflos (2009)
 Special Prize at the Television Film Festival in Baden-Baden for outstanding dramatic performance in Frau Böhm sagt Nein (2009)
 Golden Camera Award in the category Best Actress in German Frau Böhm sagt Nein and Schlaflos (2010)
 Adolf Grimme Award for her performance in Frau Böhm sagt Nein (2010)
 Bavarian Television Award for best actress says in the "TV Movie" for her role in the film Frau Böhm sagt Nein (2010)
 Grand Diagonale drama prize for lifetime achievement (2010)
 Star on the Boulevard of Stars in Berlin (2010)
 Hans Abich Award for outstanding services in television and film (Television Film Festival, Baden-Baden, 2010)
 Cultural Award of the City of Munich (2011)
 Bear (B.Z. culture prize) (2012)

References

External links 

Senta Berger-links (Yahoo group)
Interview in the FAZ newspaper on her autobiography (in German)

1941 births
Living people
Actresses from Vienna
Austrian stage actresses
Austrian film actresses
Austrian television actresses
20th-century Austrian actresses
21st-century Austrian actresses
Officers Crosses of the Order of Merit of the Federal Republic of Germany
Recipients of the Austrian Cross of Honour for Science and Art, 1st class
Writers from Vienna
Jewish Austrian actresses